The 2003 Budweiser Shootout was the first of two exhibition stock car races of the 2003 NASCAR Winston Cup Series. The 25th running of the Budweiser Shootout, and the first to be held at night to enable a broadcast in prime time, it was held on February 8, 2003, in Daytona Beach, Florida, at Daytona International Speedway, before a crowd of 75,000 spectators. Dale Earnhardt Jr. of Dale Earnhardt, Inc. won the 70-lap race starting from the 19th position. Hendrick Motorsports driver Jeff Gordon finished in second, with Roush Racing's Matt Kenseth third. It was Earnhardt's first Budweiser Shootout victory, and his first at Daytona International Speedway in the Cup Series since the 2001 Pepsi 400.

Although Geoff Bodine won the pole position by lot, he was immediately passed by Jimmie Johnson going into turn one. Kurt Busch led laps five to 15 until Earnhardt passed him on lap 16, who retained the position until every driver was required to make a mandatory ten-minute pit stop at the conclusion of lap 20. Ten laps later, Gordon became the leader, which he maintained until all competitors made a second pit stop on the 50th lap and Mark Martin moved into the first position. Gordon returned to the lead on lap 56, and he maintained it until Earnhardt passed him ten laps later. Earnhardt maintained the lead in the final four laps to win the event. No yellow flag cautions were issued during the race, which had 13 lead changes among seven different drivers.

Background

The 2003 Budweiser Shootout was the first of two non-points scoring exhibition stock car races of the 2003 NASCAR Winston Cup Series, the 25th edition of the event, and the first time it was held at night, so it could be broadcast in prime time. It was held on February 8, 2003 in Daytona Beach, Florida at Daytona International Speedway, a superspeedway that holds NASCAR races. Its standard track is a four-turn,  superspeedway. Daytona's turns are banked at 31 degrees, and the front stretch (the location of the finish line) is banked at 18 degrees.

The Budweiser Shootout was created by Busch Beer brand manager Monty Roberts as the Busch Clash in 1979.  The race, designed to promote Busch Beer, invites the fastest NASCAR drivers from the previous season to compete. The race is considered a "warm-up" for the Daytona 500. It was renamed the Bud Shootout in 1998. The name changed to the Budweiser Shootout in 2001, the Sprint Unlimited in 2013 and the Advance Auto Parts Clash in 2017.

There were 19 drivers eligible to compete in the race, including the 15 pole position winners from the 2002 season and four previous shootout winners. Races where qualifying was cancelled due to rain or where the points leader started from the pole position did not count. Tony Stewart was the race's defending champion. The race was 70 laps long, with two segments of 20 and 50 laps separated by a ten-minute pit stop. During the pit stop, teams could change tires, add fuel and make normal chassis adjustments but could not change springs, shock absorbers or rear ends. Should the race be stopped, pit crews were permitted to work on their cars in either the garage or on the pit road. Yellow caution and green-flag laps were scored in the race and the second segment would be extended beyond 50 laps if it was deemed necessary. Every rolling restart had cars alongside each other in pairs, and all lapped competitors were required to move to the rear of the field.

In other changes, NASCAR mandated every car to run a  fuel cell from the standard  cells in a bid to have an additional pit stop and prevent multi-car accidents. The smaller fuel cells meant teams were required to make an extra pit stop in the second segment. Furthermore, all the teams were required to utilize a new car package, which underwent 18 alterations to remove several aerodynamic differences (such as the rear spoiler and the deck lid) between each of the four makes of car that competed in the Cup Series to provide parity across the field. The body design of the updated car package had a uniform appearance at its center, but its front and rear underwent a minor reshaping.

Practice and qualification

Two practice sessions were held on Friday before the race. The first session lasted for 55 minutes, and the second 60 minutes. Ryan Newman set the fastest lap in the first practice session with a time of 48.330 seconds, ahead of Jeff Gordon in second and Stewart third. Terry Labonte was fourth-fastest, with Dale Earnhardt Jr. and Kurt Busch fifth and sixth. Jimmie Johnson, Bill Elliott, Matt Kenseth, and Ricky Rudd rounded out the session's top ten drivers. Labonte ran faster in the final practice session, setting a lap of 47.787 seconds to pace the field; Earnhardt was second, and Stewart duplicated his first practice session result in third place. Mark Martin placed fourth; Ward Burton came fifth, and Kenseth was sixth. Kevin Harvick, Dale Jarrett, Ken Schrader, and Gordon completed the top ten quickest competitors.

For qualifying, the nineteen participants that appeared to race chose their starting positions by lot, a feature that is unique to the event. Geoff Bodine drew the pole position, with Johnson, Busch, Rudd and Kenseth in second through fifth. Ricky Craven drew sixth place, and Jarrett chose the seventh position. Todd Bodine, Martin, and Burton selected positions eight, nine and ten. Schrader, Stewart, Elliott, Rusty Wallace, and Newman drew the following five placings. Harvick, who drew sixteenth, was followed by Labonte and Gordon. Earnhardt chose the nineteenth and final starting position for the race. Once the lot was completed, Bodine said, "This is what's called brotherly love and I'm happy to be able to help Brett out. It's a tune up for Brett to get ready for the 125s (qualifying races) and the Daytona 500. I love my brothers Brett and Todd. When we put our helmets on it gets a little heated, but this is going to be a lot of fun."

Qualifying results

Race
The 70-lap race commenced at 8:00 p.m. Eastern Standard Time (UTC−05:00), and was broadcast live in the United States on Fox. Commentary was provided by play-by-play announcer Mike Joy, with analysis from three-time Cup Series champion Darrell Waltrip, and former crew chief Larry McReynolds. Hal Marchman, pastor of Central Baptist Church in Daytona Beach, began pre-race ceremonies with an invocation. Country music group SHeDAISY performed the national anthem, and actress and model Susan Ward commanded the drivers to start their engines. No driver moved to the rear of the field during the pace laps.

At the start, Bodine was passed by Johnson entering turn one. On lap three, he felt one of his tires rubbing on his car's bodywork. Bodine drove to the garage on that lap, where suspension damage was discovered, and it necessitated his retirement from the race on the fourth lap. After the first four laps, every driver was separated by seven-tenths of a second. Johnson lost the lead to Busch on lap five. Busch led the next ten laps until Earnhardt overtook him in turn three to lead the 16th lap. During the three abreast racing action, Wallace's left-rear tire lost pressure and burst two laps later, slowing him. He remained on the lead lap, because the ten-minute pit stops for tires, fuel and car adjustments followed soon after on lap 20. At this point, Earnhardt led Busch, Johnson, Gordon and Kenseth. Earnhardt told his crew chief Tony Eury Jr. he wanted fuel and tires with no chassis adjustments because he felt comfortable with his car.

Once green flag racing resumed, Kenseth went to the outside and overtook Earnhardt for the lead on lap 22. Both drivers exchanged first place over the next seven laps, until Gordon executed a bump and run technique on Kenseth in the first turn for the lead on lap 30. On the 50th lap, every driver elected to make a second pit stop. Most competitors had two tires installed to their cars, though Johnson's pit crew replaced all four of his tires. Martin, Schrader, Todd Bodine and Rudd opted to have a fuel stop; after all the pit stops were completed, Martin took the lead on lap 52, as varying team strategies changed the running order. Martin led the next four laps before Gordon got ahead of him to return to the lead. Earnhardt moved to fifth position by the 59th lap, before advancing to third place soon after. On lap 64, Earnhardt steered left to attempt a pass on Gordon for first place, though he was unable to overtake the latter because there were no cars to provide him with drafting assistance, which led Gordon to believe the inside was the ideal position to drive on.

Two laps later, Earnhardt signalled to Newman he required drafting assistance. Newman clung onto Earnhardt's rear bumper panel, and the manoeuvre moved the latter on the outside lane past Gordon at turn three for the lead. Gordon could not respond to Earnhardt in the final four laps, as the remainder of the field went two abreast behind him, and Earnhardt held off Gordon and Kenseth to win the race after starting from last on the grid. It was Earnhardt's maiden Budweiser Shootout victory, and his first at Daytona International Speedway in the Cup Series since the 2001 Pepsi 400. Gordon finished second, Kenseth third, Newman fourth, and Burton fifth. Schrader was in second in the final seven laps as a tailwind increased his top speed, though he fell to sixth after an overtake to the outside of Earnhardt failed to materialize. Johnson, Rudd, Harvick, and Craven rounded out the top ten finishers. The first fifteen drivers finished within a second of one other. No yellow caution flags were issued since no driver had an accident or made contact with another car, and there were 13 lead changes among seven different participants. Gordon's 31 laps led was the most of any competitor. Earnhardt led four times for a total of 13 laps.

After the race
Earnhardt appeared in Victory Lane to celebrate his third victory at Daytona International Speedway. He earned $205,000 for the victory, and performed donuts in the infield grass in front of a crowd of 75,000 people. Earnhardt was unsure as to how he won the race, "There was so much happening the last two laps and there's so much going on in your mind.  You're trying to watch who is running up on the top and who is running on the bottom and you're trying to get help from those guys and get pushes. But I stayed out front. That's a tough win." Gordon said of his second-place finish, "When Junior got up there, I didn't think he had enough momentum. Then everyone started battling for second and third and it got real crazy out there. After that, it was everyone getting what they could. He's so good at these restrictor plate races." Third-placed Kenseth said the night time conditions were instrumental in determining the race's final result since the track temperatures were cooler than they were during the day, "Being at night, all three lanes had grip. It was intense for us and good for the fans."

Drivers held positive reviews of the updated car package. Wallace noted competitors could draft efficiently and that drivers could not pull away from each other, "My car handled pretty good the whole entire run. The cars, aerodynamically, stuck pretty tight. I feel real good about it." Harvick said the on-track competition resembled the initial races where cars had roof flaps installed on top of them to reduce top speeds, and he revealed there was a negligible difference in car handling, "That was pretty wild racing to tell you the truth. (The cars) suck up really good. You could pass, you could push, you could shove. They get a lot better run than the other cars used to for some reason." Kenseth said he felt the package prevented 95 percent of the possible illegal modifications to the spoilers for the Daytona races, "Everybody used to roll the spoilers down as much as they could, everybody would cheat the templates as much as they could." Craven said of the driving observed during the event, "It was like a 2½-mile Martinsville. It was perfect." The race took 58 minutes and four seconds to complete, and the margin of victory was 0.180 seconds.

Race results

References

Budweiser Shootout
Budweiser Shootout
NASCAR races at Daytona International Speedway
February 2003 sports events in the United States